Billy Bishop Airport may refer to:
Owen Sound Billy Bishop Regional Airport
Billy Bishop Toronto City Airport
 Billy Bishop Toronto City Water Aerodrome